Nader Al-Sharari (born 8 May 1996) is a Saudi Arabian professional footballer who plays as a centre-back for Pro League side Al-Shabab.

Career
Al-Shariri began his career in the youth setups of Al-Orobah. He made his debut during the 2016–17 season. On 18 April 2018, Al-Sharari scored his first goal for the club in the league match against Damac. He spent 4 seasons at Al-Orobah and made 41 appearances. On 31 January 2020, Al-Sharari joined Pro League side Abha on a 2-year contract.

Career statistics

Club

References

External links 
 

1996 births
Living people
Saudi Arabian footballers
Al-Orobah FC players
Abha Club players
Al-Shabab FC (Riyadh) players
Saudi Professional League players
Saudi First Division League players
Saudi Second Division players
Association football defenders
Association football central defenders